Wim Eyckmans (born 23 March 1973, Herentals, Belgium) is a Belgian racecar driver who starting in karting in 1986 has been in prototype racing since 2003.  He participated in Formula 3000 in 1994 and 1995 and ran the Indy Lights series in 1998.  In 1999, he competed in the Indianapolis 500 on behalf of Cheever Racing, finishing 23rd. He now owns a successful Karting company.

Career results

Complete International Formula 3000 results
(key) (Races in bold indicate pole position) (Races in italics indicate fastest lap)

American open–wheel results
(key)

Indy Lights results

IndyCar

External links
Official Website
Driver Database stats
Racing Reference - USA Stats

1973 births
Belgian racing drivers
Living people
Indianapolis 500 drivers
IndyCar Series drivers
Indy Lights drivers
International Formula 3000 drivers
European Le Mans Series drivers
People from Herentals
EFDA Nations Cup drivers
Sportspeople from Antwerp Province

Cheever Racing drivers
20th-century Belgian people